Isaac Butt  (6 September 1813 – 5 May 1879) was an Irish barrister, editor, politician, Member of Parliament in the House of Commons of the United Kingdom, economist and the founder and first leader of a number of Irish nationalist parties and organisations. He was a leader in the Irish Metropolitan Conservative Society in 1836, the Home Government Association in 1870, and the Home Rule League in 1873. Colin W. Reid  argues that Home Rule was the mechanism Butt proposed to bind Ireland to Great Britain. It would end the ambiguities of the Act of Union of 1800. He portrayed a federalised United Kingdom, which would have weakened Irish exceptionalism within a broader British context. Butt was representative of a constructive national unionism.  As an economist, he made significant contributions regarding the potential resource mobilisation and distribution aspects of protection, and analysed deficiencies in the Irish economy such as sparse employment, low productivity, and misallocation of land.  He dissented from the established Ricardian theories and favoured some welfare state concepts. As editor he made  the Dublin University Magazine a leading Irish journal of politics and literature.

Early life

Butt was born in 1813 in Glenfin, a district bordering the Finn Valley in County Donegal in Ulster, the northern province in Ireland. Glenfin is a short distance west of Ballybofey, a town in East Donegal. He was born into an Ulster Protestant family, being the son of a Church of Ireland rector, and was descended from the O'Donnells of Tyrconnell, through the Ramsays. Butt received his secondary school education at The Royal School in Raphoe in the Laggan district of East Donegal, and at Midleton College in County Cork, before going to Trinity College Dublin (TCD), at the age of fifteen, where he was elected a Scholar, and president of the (extern) College Historical Society. Whilst there he co-founded the Dublin University Magazine and edited it for four years. For much of his life he was a member of the Irish Conservative Party, and he founded the conservative Ulster Times newspaper. He became Whately Professor of Political Economy at Trinity in 1836 and held that position until 1841.

Legal career

After being called to the bar in 1838, Butt quickly established a name for himself as a brilliant barrister. He was known for his opposition to the Irish nationalist leader Daniel O'Connell's campaign for the repeal of the Act of Union. He also lectured at Trinity College, Dublin, in political economy. His experiences during the Great Famine led him to move from being an Irish unionist and an Orangeman to supporting a federal political system for the United Kingdom of Great Britain and Ireland that would give Ireland a greater degree of self-rule. This led to his involvement in Irish nationalist politics and the foundation of the Home Rule League. Butt was instrumental in fostering links between constitutional and revolutionary nationalism through his representation of members of the Fenians Society in court.

Political career

He began his career as a Tory politician on Dublin Corporation. He was Member of Parliament for Youghal from 1852 to 1865, and for Limerick from 1871 to 1879 (at the 1852 general election he had also been elected for the English constituency of Harwich, but chose to sit for Youghal).

The failed Fenian Rising in 1867 strengthened Butt's belief that a federal system was the only way to break the dreary cycle of inefficient administration punctuated by incompetent uprisings. Having defended the leaders of the Fenian revolt, Butt then from June 1869 became president of the Amnesty Association formed to secure the release of imprisoned Fenians, supported actively amongst others by P. F. Johnson.

In 1870 Butt then founded the Irish Home Government Association. This was in no sense a revolutionary organisation. It was designed to mobilise public opinion behind the demand for an Irish parliament, with, as he put it, "full control over our domestic affairs." He believed that Home Rule would promote friendship between Ireland and her neighbour to the east.

In November 1873 Butt replaced the Association with a new body, the Home Rule League, which he regarded as a pressure-group, rather than a political party. In the general election the following year, 60 of its members were elected, forming then in 1874 the Irish Parliamentary Party . However, most of those elected were men of property who were closer to the Liberal cause. In the meantime Charles Stewart Parnell had joined the League, with more radical ideas than most of the incumbent Home Rulers, and was elected to Parliament in a by-election in County Meath in 1875.

Butt had failed to win substantial concessions at Westminster on the things that mattered to most Irish people: an amnesty for the Fenians of 1867, fixity of tenure for tenant-farmers and Home Rule. Although they worked to get Home Rulers elected, many Fenians along with tenant farmers were dissatisfied with Butt's gentlemanly approach to have bills enacted, although they did not openly attack him, as his defence of the Fenian prisoners in 1867 still stood in his favour. However, soon a Belfast Home Ruler, Joseph Gillis Biggar (then a senior member of the IRB), began making extensive use of the ungentlemanly tactic of "obstructionism" to prevent bills being passed by the house.

Declined influence

When Parnell entered Parliament he took his cue from John O'Connor Power and Joseph Biggar and allied himself with those Irish members who would support him in his obstructionist campaign. MPs at that time could stand up and talk for as long as they wished on any subject. This caused havoc in Parliament. In one case they talked for 45 hours non-stop, stopping any important bills from being passed. Butt, ageing, and in failing health, could not keep up with this tactic and considered it counter-productive. In July 1877 Butt threatened to resign from the party if obstruction continued, and a gulf developed between himself and Parnell, who was growing steadily in the estimation of both the Fenians and the Home Rulers.

The climax came in December 1878, when Parliament was recalled to discuss the war in Afghanistan. Butt considered this discussion too important to the British Empire to be interrupted by obstructionism and publicly warned the Irish members to refrain from this tactic. He was fiercely denounced by the young Nationalist John Dillon, who continued his attacks with considerable support from other Home Rulers at a meeting of the Home Rule League in February 1879. Although he defended himself with dignity, Butt, and all and sundry, knew that his role in the party was at an end. Barry O'Brien, in his biography of Parnell, interviews 'X' who relates: 'It was very painful. I was very fond of Butt. He was himself the kindest-hearted man in the world, and here was I going to do the unkindest thing to him.'

Butt, who had been suffering from bronchitis, had a stroke the following May and died within a week. He was replaced by William Shaw, who in turn was replaced by Charles Stewart Parnell in 1880.

Personal life

Butt amassed debts and pursued romances. It was said that at meetings he was occasionally heckled by women with whom he had fathered children. He was also involved in a financial scandal when it was revealed that he had taken money from several Indian princes to represent their interests in parliament.

He died on 5 May 1879 in Clonskeagh in Dublin. His remains were brought by train, via Strabane, to Stranorlar in the east of County Donegal, where he is buried in a corner of the Church of Ireland cemetery beneath a tree by which he used to sit and dream as a boy.

Despite his chaotic lifestyle and political limitations, Butt was capable of inspiring deep personal loyalty. Some of his friends, such as John Butler Yeats (father of the poet W. B. Yeats) and the future Catholic Bishop of Limerick, Edward Thomas O'Dwyer, retained a lasting hostility towards Parnell for his role in Butt's downfall.

In May 2010 the Church of Ireland (Anglican) parishes of Stranorlar, Meenglass and Kilteevogue instigated an annual memorial Service and Lecture in Butt's honour, inviting members of the professions of law, politics and journalism to reflect aspects of his life. Speakers have included Dr. Joe Mulholland, Senator David Norris, Dr. Chris McGimpsey and Prof. Brian Walker. His grave has been restored and the memorial now includes a wreath.

In literature

 The novel Hogan MP by May Laffan Hartley features a hostile portrait of Butt as "Mr. Rebutter". The eponymous protagonist, John O'Rooney Hogan, shares some traits and background of John O'Connor Power.
Butt briefly appears in Harry Harrison's alternate history novels Stars and Stripes trilogy.

Arms

References

Further reading

 >Hall, Wayne E. "The 'Dublin University Magazine' and Isaac Butt, 1834-1838." Victorian Periodicals Review 20.2 (1987): 43–56. online

 McCaffrey, Lawrence J. "Isaac Butt and the Home Rule Movement: A Study in Conservative Nationalism." Review of Politics 22.1 (1960): 72–95. online
 Moss, Laurence S. "Isaac Butt and the early development of the marginal utility theory of imputation." American Journal of Economics and Sociology 69.1 (2010): 210–231. online
 O’Day, Alan. "Isaac Butt and Neglected Political Economists." in English, Irish and Subversives Among the Dismal Scientists  (2010): 375+.
 Reid, Colin W. "‘An Experiment in Constructive Unionism’: Isaac Butt, Home Rule and Federalist Political Thought during the 1870s." English Historical Review 129.537 (2014): 332-361. online
 Spence, Joseph. "Isaac Butt, Irish nationality and the conditional defence of the Union, 1833–70." in D. George Boyce ed. Defenders of the Union: A Survey of British and Irish Unionism Since 1801 (Routledge, 2002) pp. 73–97.

  , Part One pp. 39–40, 43–46, Part Two, 'Parliamentary Manoeuvres,' pp. 43–46.
 Thornley, David. Isaac Butt and home rule (MacGibbon & Kee, 1964).
 White, Terence de Vere, The Road of Excess, Dublin, 1946.

Primary sources
 Butt, Isaac. Irish federalism : its meaning, its objects, and its hopes (1870) a primary source; online
 Butt, Isaac. The Irish people and the Irish land: a letter to Lord Lifford, with comments on the publications of Lord Dufferin and Lord Rosse (J. Falconer, 1867) online.
 Butt, Isaac. Land tenure in Ireland: a plea for the celtic race (J. Falconer, 1866) online.
 Butt, Isaac. Protection to Home Industry: Some Cases of Its Advantages Considered: the Substance of Two Lectures Delivered Before the University of Dublin, in Michaelmas Term, 1840: to which is Added an Appendix, Containing Dissertations on Some Points Connected with the Subject (Hodges and Smith, 1846) online
 Butt, Isaac. Home Government for Ireland: Irish Federalism! Its Meaning, Its Objects, and Its Hopes (Irish home rule league, 1874) online.

External links

 
Butt's speech on the union in 1874

1813 births
1879 deaths
Alumni of Trinity College Dublin
Home Rule League MPs
Irish Anglicans
Irish barristers
Irish Conservative Party MPs
Irish Queen's Counsel
Members of the Parliament of the United Kingdom for County Cork constituencies (1801–1922)
Members of the Parliament of the United Kingdom for County Limerick constituencies (1801–1922)
People educated at Midleton College
Politicians from County Donegal
Protestant Irish nationalists
Scholars of Trinity College Dublin
UK MPs 1852–1857
UK MPs 1857–1859
UK MPs 1859–1865
UK MPs 1868–1874
UK MPs 1874–1880
People educated at the Royal and Prior School
19th-century Irish politicians